The Magic Bird is a 1968 Italian animated film. It is also known as Perils of Problemina.

See also
List of animated feature films: 1960s

References

External links

1968 animated films
1968 films
Animated feature films
Animated films about insects
Italian animated films
1960s Italian-language films
1960s Italian films